Ruraldale is an unincorporated community in Upshur County, West Virginia, United States.  It lies along Hacker's Creek Road.  Ruraldale is home to one place of worship, Pleasant Valley Methodist Church.

References 

Unincorporated communities in West Virginia
Unincorporated communities in Upshur County, West Virginia